Mneme , also known as , is a retrograde irregular satellite of Jupiter. It was discovered by teams of astronomers led by Brett J. Gladman and Scott S. Sheppard in 2003, and was provisionally designated S/2003 J 21.
 
Mneme is about 2 kilometres in diameter, and orbits Jupiter at an average distance of 21,427,000 kilometres in 640.769 days, at an inclination of 149° to the ecliptic (148° to Jupiter's equator) with an eccentricity of 0.2214. Its average orbital speed is 2.43 km/s.

It was named in March 2005 after Mneme, one of the three original Muses. She is sometimes confused with Mnemosyne, mother of the Muses (the three or the nine, depending on the author) by Zeus (Jupiter).

Mneme belongs to the Ananke group, retrograde irregular moons which orbit Jupiter between 19.3 and 22.7 million kilometres, at inclinations of roughly 150°.

References

Ananke group
Moons of Jupiter
Discoveries by Brett J. Gladman
Discoveries by Scott S. Sheppard
Irregular satellites
20030209
Moons with a retrograde orbit